Feyerick is a surname. Notable people with the surname include:

Deborah Feyerick, American journalist and CNN correspondent
Ferdinand Feyerick (1865–1920), Belgian Olympic fencer
Jacques Feyerick (1874–1955), Belgian athlete
Robert Feyerick (1892–1940), Belgian Olympic fencer, son of Ferdinand

See also
Feerick